Papiliotrema mangaliensis (synonym Cryptococcus mangaliensis) is a fungal species in the family Rhynchogastremataceae. The species was  first found in its yeast state in the Florida Everglades.

References

Further reading
Jones, EB Gareth, and Jack W. Fell. "4 Basidiomycota." Marine Fungi: and Fungal-like Organisms (2012): 49.
Fell, Jack W. "6 Yeasts in marine environments." Marine Fungi: and Fungal-like Organisms (2012): 91.

External links

Tremellomycetes